Suketo Khandwala, known professionally as Kato Khandwala, was an American record producer, songwriter, mixer, and engineer. He worked with many different artists such as Blondie, Paramore, My Chemical Romance, Pop Evil and The Pretty Reckless.

Khandwala died on April 25, 2018, at the age of 47, due to injuries sustained in a motorcycle accident in North Hollywood, Los Angeles.

Selected discography

References

1970s births
2018 deaths
American audio engineers
American male songwriters
Record producers from California
Motorcycle road incident deaths
Place of birth missing
Road incident deaths in California
Year of birth uncertain